Doyle Township is a civil township of Schoolcraft County in the U.S. state of Michigan. The population was 624 at the 2010 census. This area is known for its pristine beaches on Lake Michigan and inland lakes, such as Gulliver Lake, McDonald Lake, and Clear Lake, among others.

Communities
Gulliver is an unincorporated community in the township on U.S. 2 on the shores of Gulliver Lake. 
Whitedale is a defunct town located near Gulliver. The town was abandoned in the 1950s.

History

A petition was first filed to form a township, Gulliver Township, in May 1890. Upon filing the petition, it raised much opposition in Manistique and from a few local families in Gulliver. For political reasons and an approaching election year, Manistique did not want to lose their voting power involving districts 41–45, Range 14. For an unknown reason, the subject was tabled until the meeting of October 15, 1890. The same petition was again presented and the same groups of people opposed the forming of a township. There was so much opposition that name calling and fist fights broke out at the meeting. Detailed reports from the Pioneer Tribune in Manistique recorded these fights and named the people involved. A main point in the case was the accusation that the names listed on the original petition were fraudulent and would have to be checked for legal residency. Through the legal battles, the case eventually came before the Michigan Supreme Court. The submitted petition checked out fine. However, one of the objections made by a State Representative was the name “Gulliver” brought to mind a village of elves and giants. The name was hastily changed on the petition to Doyle Township after Michael J. Doyle, a Democratic legislator from Sault Ste. Marie, was recruited to negotiate a settlement. The citizens were so impressed by his negotiating skills they decided to name the township after him than for either of the feuding politicians. Michael J. Doyle had been practicing law in the Sault since 1887, became a City Attorney in 1890, and was then elected Chippewa County Representative to the Michigan Legislature in 1891.

Geography

Demographics
As of the census of 2000, there were 630 people, 256 households, and 193 families residing in the township.  The population density was 4.3 per square mile (1.7/km2).  There were 524 housing units at an average density of 3.6 per square mile (1.4/km2).  The racial makeup of the township was 91.43% White, 0.48% African American, 5.24% Native American, and 2.86% from two or more races. Hispanic or Latino of any race were 0.95% of the population.

There were 256 households, out of which 27.7% had children under the age of 18 living with them, 69.9% were married couples living together, 3.1% had a female householder with no husband present, and 24.6% were non-families. 19.9% of all households were made up of individuals, and 7.8% had someone living alone who was 65 years of age or older.  The average household size was 2.46 and the average family size was 2.83.

In the township the population was spread out, with 21.7% under the age of 18, 5.7% from 18 to 24, 27.8% from 25 to 44, 27.9% from 45 to 64, and 16.8% who were 65 years of age or older.  The median age was 42 years. For every 100 females, there were 107.9 males.  For every 100 females age 18 and over, there were 108.0 males.

The median income for a household in the township was $36,250, and the median income for a family was $39,018. Males had a median income of $33,125 versus $20,625 for females. The per capita income for the township was $18,740.  About 4.8% of families and 8.5% of the population were below the poverty line, including 10.3% of those under age 18 and 6.4% of those age 65 or over.

References

Townships in Schoolcraft County, Michigan
Townships in Michigan
Michigan populated places on Lake Michigan
Populated places established in 1890
1890 establishments in Michigan